X101 or X-101 may refer to:

 Kh-101/X-101, a Russian long range cruise missile
 X-101 Destroyer, an album produced by Mike Banks (musician)